Toastmasters International (TI) is a US-headquartered nonprofit educational organization that operates clubs worldwide for the purpose of promoting communication, public speaking, and leadership.

History

The organization grew out of a single club founded by Ralph C. Smedley on October 22, 1924, at the YMCA in Santa Ana, California, United States. It originated as a set of classes with the aim of improving the communication skills of the young men under his charge. Toastmasters International was incorporated under Californian law on December 19, 1932.

The first international chapter was established in Vancouver, Canada, in 1932. The organization began admitting women in 1973.

Throughout its history, Toastmasters has served over four million people, and today the organization serves over 364,000 members in 145 countries, through its 16,200 member clubs. Toastmasters membership increased rapidly around the turn of the century, nearing 16,000 clubs worldwide by 2016.

Toastmasters club structure
Toastmasters International uses a local club-based structure, with an average club size of around 22 members. Meetings are held every week or every other week and usually in the evening, although some clubs meet in the morning or afternoon. Each club operates as a separate entity with a set of requirements leading to chartered status for them to be recognised as official Toastmasters clubs. Chartered status allows clubs to use the names, promotional material and programme of Toastmasters International.

Every meeting is based around a set of organized speeches. Speakers are given feedback, often by a more experienced member, who then gives an impromptu speech with constructive feedback based on their performance.

Part of meetings is devoted to Table Topics, which are impromptu speeches which are assigned on the spot by a Topicsmaster. The goal of this is to think on one's feet with minimal preparation. In some clubs attendees are then asked to vote on whom they thought gave the best speech.

Toastmasters International places a large emphasis on building the public speaking and leadership skills of its members. The current education system consists of eleven differing paths suited to their needs and requirements, based around Public Speaking, Interpersonal Communication, Management, Strategic Leadership, and Confidence. Each path consists of 14 projects. Content consists of online and print materials, it being the first time in the organization’s history to provide modern technology in its programme. Content is available in English, French and German.

Public speaking championship

Toastmasters runs an international public speaking championship formally known as the Toastmasters International World Champion of Public Speaking, which is held annually at its International Convention in August. It started in 1938 and involves over 33,000 participants in 141 countries, making it the world's largest oratory contest. There is a six-month process of elimination to reach the semifinals; in 2018, there were 106 participants who made it that far. There are ten places in the final, and speeches are judged on content, gestures, organization, and style.

See also 

 Association of Speakers Clubs
 Communications training
 Dale Carnegie
 List of recreational organizations
 Public speaking

 Tim Allen
 Everett Alvarez Jr.
 Bill Bennett
 Robert Blakeley
 James Brady
 Nancy Brinker
 Susan Cain
 Joe Conley
 Pete Coors
 Ben Couch
 Philip B. Crosby
 Carl Dixon
 Mark Eaton
 Debbi Fields
 Steve Fraser
 Arthur Gorrie
 James Patrick Hickey
 Napoleon Hill
 Tara Dawn Holland
 K. C. Jones
 Billie Jean King
 Richard Lamm
 David Lin
 Linda Lingle
 Jim Lovell
 Harvey Mackay
 Leona Marlin-Romeo
 Chris Matthews
 Terrence McCann
 Robert D. McTeer
 Robert D. Nesen
 Todd Newton
 Leonard Nimoy
 Sam Nunn
 Ayan Pal
 Anita Perez Ferguson
 Tom Peters
 Geoff Regan
 Pat Roberts
 Wally Schirra
 Bikram Singh (general)
 Ralph C. Smedley
 Tom Tait
 John V. Tunney
 Manoj Vasudevan
 King Vidor
 Tracy Wilson
 Laura Yeager
 John Young (astronaut)

References

Further reading

External links 
 
 A full Toastmaster meeting (at Toastmasters' YouTube channel)

 
Communication skills training
Educational organizations based in the United States
International organizations based in the United States
International educational organizations
Leadership training
Non-profit organizations based in California
Organizations established in 1924
1924 establishments in California
Organizations based in Orange County, California